Friedrichswerder Church was the first Neo-Gothic church built in Berlin, Germany. It was designed by an architect better known for his Neoclassical architecture, Karl Friedrich Schinkel, and was built under his direction from 1824 to 1831.

The building is maintained by the Prussian Cultural Heritage Foundation and is part of the Berlin State Museums' ensemble. In late 2012, the building was closed due to structural damage caused by nearby construction. After extensive restoration work completed in early October 2019, the damage was repaired and exhibitions from the Alte Nationalgalerie (the Old National Gallery) returned. These include a collection of nineteenth-century German sculptures, showing works of Johann Gottfried Schadow, Karl Friedrich Schinkel and Christian Daniel Rauch, among others. On the upper floor is an exhibition of the work and life of Karl Friedrich Schinkel.

Gallery

References

External links

 

Berlin Friedrichswerder
Berlin Friedrichswerder
Berlin Friedrichswerder
Berlin Friedrichswerder
Heritage sites in Berlin
Karl Friedrich Schinkel buildings
Buildings and structures in Mitte
Former churches in Berlin
United Protestant church buildings in Berlin
Berlin Friedrichswerder
Art museums and galleries in Berlin
Berlin State Museums